The following is a list of animated television series originating from or animated in Canada.

Canadian animated television series
For shows produced by entities that have since been re-organized, their former names are listed in brackets. All channels listed are Canadian unless otherwise noted.

Notes

See also 
 List of Canadian television series

Lists of animated television series
Animated series

Animated